Vaal Reefs is a gold bearing reef which is mined near the town of Orkney in Dr Kenneth Kaunda District Municipality in the North West province of South Africa.

The town of Orkney is home to a large gold mining operation originally owned by AngloGold Ashanti, a company that was originally incorporated in 1944 under the name of Vaal Reefs Exploration and Mining Company Limited.

Disaster
A mining accident on 10 May 1995 killed 104 miners. It is the deadliest ever elevator disaster.

This tragedy brought two key changes to the mining industry: The immediate implementation of a new Health & Safety Act and shareholders providing compensation to dead workers' dependents. In this case, 431 dependents became beneficiaries of the Vaal Reefs Disaster Trust. They lived or live across South Africa (114), Lesotho (219), Mozambique (54), Botswana (31) and Eswatini (13).

References

Populated places in the City of Matlosana Local Municipality
Mining disasters in South Africa
1995 in South Africa
1995 mining disasters
1995 disasters in South Africa